The DeWitt Motor Company produced automobiles in a factory in North Manchester, Indiana from about 1908 through 1910.

The vehicles came in two models, a 2-seater runabout and a 2-seater light truck. Both were high wheelers which much resembled standard buggies of the era, and were powered by a simple 2-cylinder opposed air-cooled engine.

The company was started and named after Virgil DeWitt, a Swedish immigrant to the United States.

References
 Historical Society: DeWitt Motor Company

Cars introduced in 1908
Defunct motor vehicle manufacturers of the United States
Motor vehicle manufacturers based in Indiana
Cars powered by boxer engines
Vehicle manufacturing companies established in 1908
Vehicle manufacturing companies disestablished in 1910
1908 establishments in Indiana
1910 disestablishments in Indiana
Defunct companies based in Indiana

1900s cars
Brass Era vehicles
Highwheeler